John Sell (February 2, 1816 – September 17, 1883) was a Democrat from Addison, Washington County, Wisconsin who served one term as a member of the Wisconsin State Assembly from Washington County during the ninth (1856) session of the state legislature. He was elected by a large majority.

References

External links

People from Addison, Wisconsin
1816 births
1883 deaths
19th-century American politicians
Democratic Party members of the Wisconsin State Assembly